Linda Maria "Foppa" Forsberg (born 19 June 1985) is a former Swedish footballer.

Throughout her career she played for Hammarby IF, Djurgårdens IF and LdB Malmö in Sweden's Damallsvenskan. As a member of the Swedish national team, she played in the 2007 and 2011 World Cups and the 2008 Summer Olympics.

In 2007, Forsberg was voted as the Best Rookie of the Year in Sweden. She subsequently won two leagues with LdB Malmö.

Footnotes

References

External links
 Club Statistics 
 Club Profile 
 National Team Profile 

Living people
Swedish women's footballers
Olympic footballers of Sweden
Footballers at the 2008 Summer Olympics
1985 births
Sweden women's international footballers
2011 FIFA Women's World Cup players
Damallsvenskan players
Hammarby Fotboll (women) players
Djurgårdens IF Fotboll (women) players
FC Rosengård players
People from Upplands Väsby Municipality
Women's association football wingers
2007 FIFA Women's World Cup players
Sportspeople from Stockholm County